Suckling Airways was an airline that focused on ACMI (Aircraft, Crew, Maintenance and Insurance) work and ad hoc air charters for business and sporting organisations. It had its head office at Cambridge Airport, Cambridgeshire. In 2013 it was integrated into its parent company Loganair.

History 
The airline was established in November 1984 and started operations in 1986. It was founded as Suckling Aviation by Roy and Merlyn Suckling, originally operating charter services from a grass runway in Ipswich. Roy Suckling had been a flying instructor at Ipswich Flying Club, and his wife Merlyn was a lawyer. Scheduled services began on 26 April 1986 from Ipswich Airport to Manchester and Amsterdam using a single 18-seat Dornier 228. The service was distinguished by the friendly 'family' atmosphere engendered by both flight and ground staff.

In the winter of 1987, higher than average rainfall began to cause problems at Ipswich Airport, with the grass runway reportedly being damaged by the Suckling Dornier. The damage was particularly acute at the ends of the runway where the aircraft would make its turn. Region Air, the airport operating company, complained vociferously that the Dornier was churning up the runway, and in February 1988, Suckling was forced to temporarily relocate to RAF Wattisham, before finding a more permanent home at Cambridge. Ipswich Airport has subsequently closed.

A prominent moment at this time was a lengthy feature about the airline on BBC television's "40 Minutes"  which showed the introduction of the Dornier 228, and the in-flight meals being prepared in a private home kitchen, although by a professional chef.

Modest expansion followed the airline's move to Cambridge, and the airline upgraded to the larger Dornier 328. Services to Edinburgh began, as well as a parallel service from Norwich to the Scottish city. By 1999 the airline was carrying 110,000 passengers on its fleet of Dorniers and had started services from London City Airport to Dundee and Glasgow.

It was during that year that investment was secured from Brian Souter, founder and chairman of the Perth-based transport group Stagecoach and his sister Ann Gloag. Souter and Gloag purchased a 90% stake in the airline for £5m and announced its rebranding as ScotAirways. The Suckling family would remain in charge of the day-to-day management of the airline keeping the head office in Cambridge, while Souter became chairman. A rather ambitious expansion programme began, establishing a hub at London City with services to Edinburgh, Aberdeen, Inverness and Paris, and also from Inverness and Southampton to Amsterdam.

Shortly after the September 11, 2001 attacks in the United States, the airline found itself in the midst of the crisis surrounding the aviation industry. Cutbacks were required for ScotAirways’ survival, and the services from Inverness, Aberdeen, Glasgow, Paris, Norwich and Cambridge were axed, some only a matter of months since their launch. With the abandonment of Cambridge Airport, Dundee effectively became the base for the carrier’s reservations and maintenance, while the head office remained in Cambridge.

During 2004, the airline marked its recovery by recording its first profit in several years. Frequencies on the remaining routes were increased. The airline carried over 200,000 passengers in 2004, achieving a far higher figure on just three routes than the previous larger network. In the face of heavy competition from British Airways on the Edinburgh to London City route, ScotAirways introduced its first jet aircraft, an 80-seat British Aerospace 146, onto the route on 9 May 2005. Code share arrangements were put in place with Flybe on the Edinburgh service and KLM Cityhopper on the Amsterdam route.

On 18 September 2006 it was announced that Ann Gloag and Brian Souter had sold their combined stakes in the airline to Roy and Merlyn Suckling.

Between 26 March 2007 and 31 December 2010, ScotAirways operated as a partner airline to the brand new 'CityJet for Air France' concept which took to the skies from London City Airport. ScotAirways operated its existing services to Edinburgh and Dundee as codeshare services with Air France, and in addition launched new services to George Best Belfast City Airport, Strasbourg and Eindhoven from London City Airport on behalf of CityJet. On 10 August 2007 ScotAirways ceased operations on the Southampton-Amsterdam route, and the route to Belfast was discontinued in Spring of 2008.

By 2 September 2007 the airline stopped operating its own scheduled services, re-positioning the business to concentrate on ACMI lease work.

In November 2007 ScotAirways began providing ACMI services for Channel Islands airline  Blue Islands. One Dornier 328 was painted in the Blue Islands livery and operated routes from Jersey Airport to Geneva Airport and Zurich Airport.On 8 July 2011, it was announced that Glasgow based airline Loganair had agreed to buy Suckling Airways. The company continued to trade as a separate airline which held its own licences and approvals until April 2013 when it was fully integrated with Loganair. The airline dropped its trading name of ScotAirways and reverted to its registered name of Suckling Airways in July 2011. The re-brand was part of the deal with Loganair.

Due to the cessation of the London City to Edinburgh route by CityJet, it was announced Suckling Airways would close the London City base at the end of October 2013.

As of April 2013 Suckling Airways ceased to operate as an airline, with the aircraft being transferred to Loganair. Flight deck, engineering and cabin crew became full Loganair employees. Other staff were made redundant with headquarters functions transferred to Glasgow.

Fleet 
Prior to ceasing operations, Suckling Airways operated six Dornier 328 turboprop aircraft. All were transferred to Loganair.

See also
 List of defunct airlines of the United Kingdom

References

External links

Suckling Airways - Official website
Suckling Airways aircraft

Defunct airlines of the United Kingdom
Airlines established in 1984
Airlines disestablished in 2013
Transport in Dundee
British companies established in 1984